Donnie Hamzik (born October 18, 1956) is an American musician and the former drummer of the heavy metal band Manowar.

Career
Hamzik was born in Binghamton, New York. He was discovered by Joey DeMaio in the rock club Agora Ballroom in Hollywood, FL when a mutual friend brought DeMaio down to see Hamzik play. It was not until a year later, when Manowar had secured their record deal with Liberty Records, that DeMaio and Ross the Boss went to Florida and played together with Hamzik and recorded their debut album Battle Hymns. At that point, Hamzik was officially a member of Manowar.

Hamzik left the band in 1983 and was replaced by Scott Columbus. He again appeared with Manowar on stage during "Earthshaker" Fest 2005 in Germany along with all other Manowar members past and present.

In 2009, Hamzik reunited with Manowar, due to personal differences between Columbus and the rest of the band. He took part in Magic Circle Festival 2009 and also recorded the EP Thunder in the Sky.

On October 15, 2010, DeMaio announced on Facebook that Hamzik was officially a member of Manowar again after a 26-year absence.

For 2017's The Final Battle tour, Manowar replaced Hamzik with Brazilian drummer Marcus Castellani.

References

External links
Official Manowar website

Manowar members
American heavy metal drummers
Living people
1956 births